The 2021–22 Ukrainian Amateur Cup season started on August 18, 2021. The competition was abandoned at semifinals stage due to the Russian aggression.

Participated clubs
In bold are clubs that are active at the same season AAFU championship (parallel round-robin competition).

 Dnipropetrovsk Oblast (1): Lehioner Dnipro
 Donetsk Oblast (1): Portovyk Mariupol
 Ivano-Frankivsk Oblast (2): Harda Kalush, Blaho-Yunist Verkhnia
 Kirovohrad Oblast (1): Zirka Kropyvnytskyi
 Kyiv Oblast (8): Ronin Lisne, Dzhuniors Shpytky, Atlet Kyiv, Sokil Mykhailivka-Rubezhivka, Olimpiysky Koledzh imeni Piddubnoho Kyiv (OKIP Kyiv), Druzhba Myrivka, Nyva Buzova, UCSA Kyiv
 Luhansk Oblast (1): Skif Shulhynka
 Lviv Oblast (2): FC Kulykiv, FC Mykolaiv
 Poltava Oblast (1): Olimpiya Savyntsi
 Rivne Oblast (2): Mayak Sarny, ODEK Orzhiv

 Sumy Oblast (1): Veleten Hlukhiv
 Vinnytsia Oblast (1): YaSKO Sharhorod
 Volyn Oblast (1): Lutsksantekhmontazh No.536 Lutsk
 Zakarpattia Oblast (1): FC Khust
 Zaporizhzhia Oblast (2): Metalurh-2 Zaporizhia, Motor Zaporizhia
 Zhytomyr Oblast (2): Polissia Stavky, Zviahel Novohrad-Volynskyi

Notes
 Olimpiya Savyntsi has competed also in the 2021–22 Ukrainian Cup.
 Portovyk Mariupol is a participant of the Zaporizhia Oblast championship due to the ongoing Russian occupation of eastern Ukraine.

Results

Preliminary round
First leg games were scheduled to be played on 18 August and second leg on 25 August.

|}
Notes:
 Some dates were later adjusted. The legs for the match Sokil Mykhailivka-Rubezhivka and Lehioner Dnipro were reversed from the original draw. Several match pairs rescheduled their second leg to September 1.
 Scheduled for 18 August, the match Dzhuniors Shpytky and Atlet Kyiv did not take place. The hosting team failed to reserve an ambulance vehicle required by competition regulations. Dzuniors were awarded a technical loss (0:3).
 The original face off between Druzhba Myrivka and Veleten Hlukhiv was canceled soon after the draw. Some teams were re-drawn having their legs scheduled for September 1 and 8.

Round of 16
Six other clubs Mayak Sarny, ODEK Orzhiv, Nyva Buzova, Olimpiya Savyntsi, Metalurh-2 Zaporizhia and Motor Zaporizhia received a bye to the round. First leg games were scheduled to be played on 8 September and second leg on 15 September.

|}

Quarterfinals
First leg games were played on 29 September, second leg games on 5–6 October.

|}
Notes:

Semifinals

|}

Final

|}

See also
 2021–22 Ukrainian Football Amateur League
 2021–22 Ukrainian Cup

Notes

References

External links
 Official website of the Association of Amateur Football of Ukraine (AAFU)
 Artur Valerko. The AAFU Cup: convincing start for Skif, Sokil, Polissia. Gilmar reminds about himself with a bright victory (Кубок ААФУ: переконливий старт Скіфа, Сокола та Полісся. Жилмар нагадує про себе яскравою перемогою). Sport Arena. 20 August 2021.
 Artur Valerko. The AAFU Cup: Atlet, Ronin, Skif and Sokil are in the Round of 16 (Кубок ААФУ: Атлет, Ронін, Скіф і Сокіл – в 1/8 фіналу). sportarena.com. 27 August 2021.
 Artur Valerko. The AAFU Cup: Polissia of Gilmar and LSTM of Kabanov are in the Round of 16 (Кубок ААФУ: Полісся Жилмара та ЛСТМ Кабанова – в 1/8 фіналу). sportarena.com. 2 September 2021.
 Artur Valerko. The AAFU Cup: goals from Kabanov and the European champion among lads (Кубок ААФУ: голи від Кабанова та чемпіона Європи серед юнаків). sportarena.com. 9 September 2021
 Artur Valerko. The AAFU Cup: drama in Verkhnia, rout in Orzhiv (Кубок ААФУ: драма в Верхній, розгром у Оржеві). sportarena.com. 16 September 2021
 Artur Valerko. The AAFU Cup: Dryzhba knocked Sharko out, and in championship took place a postponed match (Кубок ААФУ: Дружба вибила Шарко, а в чемпіонаті відбувся перенесений матч). sportarena.com. 23 September 2021
 Artur Valerko. The AAFU Cup: a bold bid from Olimpiya for semifinals qualification, favorable first steps of Mykolaiv and Motor (Кубок ААФУ: гучна заявка Олімпії на вихід у півфінал, сприятливі перші кроки Миколаєва та Мотора). sportarena.com. 1 October 2021

Ukrainian Amateur Cup
Ukrainian Amateur Cup
Amateur Cup
Sports events affected by the 2022 Russian invasion of Ukraine